Barnim VI, Duke of Pomerania ( – 22 September 1405 in Pütnitz, near Ribnitz-Damgarten) was duke of Pomerania-Wolgast from 1394 to 1405. He was the son of Wartislaw VI of Pomerania-Wolgast.

Barnim is known for his engagement in piracy. He erected a fort and a port for this purpose in Ahrenshoop, which was destroyed by Rostock in 1395. He allowed the Victual Brothers, a pirate organization assaulting vessels of the Hanseatic League in the Baltic Sea, to use the Peene river as a winter refuge and the Bay of Greifswald as a basis. In 1398, he signed a treaty with the Teutonic Knights not to further support the Victual Brothers (then also "Likedeelers"), but kept on engaging in piracy himself. On one of his expeditions, he was caught by the Hanseatic League in Kopenhagen's port. From 1400-1403, he aided the dukes of Mecklenburg-Werle in their campaigns against Lübeck. Barnim himself was wounded once at Lübeck's gates.

In 1405, Barnim died of the Black Death. To avoid this fate, he went on a pilgrimage to Kenz near Barth, but died on his way in Pütnitz (a part of today's Ribnitz-Damgarten) on 23 September 1405. He was buried in Kenz, where a large wooden statue resembling Barnim was furnished.

Marriage and issue
He married Veronica of Hohenzollern, daughter of Frederick V, Burgrave of Nuremberg, and had at least two sons:
 Barnim VII, Duke of Pomerania
 Wartislaw IX, Duke of Pomerania

See also
List of Pomeranian duchies and dukes
History of Pomerania
Duchy of Pomerania
House of Pomerania

References

Ancestors 

Dukes of Pomerania
People from Vorpommern-Rügen
German pirates
1360s births

1405 deaths
Year of birth uncertain
15th-century deaths from plague (disease)